"Tribal Dance" is a song by Belgian/Dutch Eurodance band 2 Unlimited. It was their sixth single, released in April 1993 from the band's second album, No Limits! (1993). The UK release omitted the main rap, but left in more vocals from Ray Slijngaard than any of their previous releases. The single scored chart success in many European countries topping the charts in Finland, Portugal and Spain. Outside Europe, the song topped the chart in Israel and the Canadian RPM Dance/Urban chart, while peaking at number seven on the US Billboard Hot Dance Club Play chart. "Tribal Dance" also peaked within the top 5 in Australia, Austria, Belgium, Denmark, France, Germany, Ireland, Netherlands, Norway, Sweden, Switzerland, the UK and Zimbabwe. 

In 1994, the song received an award in the category for "Best Techno 12-inch" at the WMC International Dance Music Awards in the US. In 2004, a new version of the song, titled "Tribal Dance 2.4" was released. It charted in both Austria and Germany, peaking at number 58 and 78.

Composition

The track features a trumpet riff and different kinds of drums throughout the song and the "Say that again" lyric at the start of the track was sampled from the film Back to the Future.

Chart performance
"Tribal Dance" was a huge hit on the charts in several continents. In Europe, the song peaked at number one in Finland, Portugal and Spain, as well as on the Eurochart Hot 100 and the European Dance Radio Chart in June 1993. In addition, the single entered the top 10 also in Austria (3), Belgium (2), Denmark (3), France (4), Germany (2), Ireland (2), Italy (2), the Netherlands (10), Norway (4), Sweden (2), Switzerland (2) and the United Kingdom. In the latter, it peaked at number four on 2 May 1993, in its first week at the UK Singles Chart. It stayed at that position for two weeks, and also peaked at number seven on the UK Dance Singles Chart. 

Outside Europe, the song scored chart success in Israel, peaking at number-one, spending two weeks at the top. In Canada, it also topped the RPM Dance/Urban chart. In the US, the song peaked at number seven on the Billboard Hot Dance Club Play chart. On the African continent, "Tribal Dance" peaked at number four in Zimbabwe. In Australia and New Zealand, it reached number seven and 38, respectively. 

"Tribal Dance" was awarded with a gold record in Germany, after 250,000 singles were sold.

Critical reception
Alan Jones from Music Week gave the song four out of five, writing, "This is the usual high-octane, careering dance contender in rave/techno mould. It could hardly be as big as "No Limit", and is probably a little too similar, albeit with some ethnic sounding wailing, presumably to justify the title." He added, "Instant smash, of course". Wendi Cermak from The Network Forty noted that here, 2 Unlimited "hits the dance floor with another tribal trancer". A reviewer from Newcastle Evening Chronicle described it as a "brash, action packed pounder". Gail Heritage of Port Lincoln Times declared it "a mix of rhythmic beat, almost changing at every eight bars, centring around the harmonic voice of Anita, before looming into a jungle of rap by Ray." She added, "'Tribal Dance' was one of my favourites on the album — those jungle drums just seem to be calling me to the dance floor." James Hamilton from the RM Dance Update viewed it as a "jungle drummed simple chanting galloper". Toby Anstis, reviewing songs for Smash Hits, stated that the song is "a nice bit of pop". An editor, Leesa Daniels, said it will "probably be number one for weeks." Australian student newspaper Woroni called it a "thumping, driven dance track", naming it an "obvious highlight" of the No Limits! album.

Music video
The accompanying music video for "Tribal Dance" was directed by British director Nick Burgess-Jones. He had previously directed the video for "No Limit". "Tribal Dance" is set in a jungle using blue screen in order to create the appearance of members of the band swinging across a jungle backdrop. A picture-in-picture screen showing a video game is also used. There are two versions; the rap version and the no rap version. "Tribal Dance" received heavy rotation on MTV Europe in June 1993 and the no rap version was later published on 2 Unlimited's official YouTube channel in March 2014. As of December 2022, the video had generated more than 4,1 million views.

Track listings

 7-inch single (1993)
 "Tribal Dance" (Edit) — 3:43
 "Tribal Dance" (Rap Edit) — 3:41

 12-inch maxi, Belgium (1993) 
 "Tribal Dance" (Extended) — 5:11
 "Tribal Dance" (Extended Rap) — 5:11
 "Tribal Dance" (Automatic African Remix) — 4:35
 "Tribal Dance" (Automatic Breakbeat Remix) — 4:48
			
 12-inch maxi, US (1993)
 "Tribal Dance" (Extended Mix) — 5:14
 "Tribal Dance" (Extended Rap Mix) — 5:10
 "Tribal Dance" (Radio Version) — 3:41
 "Tribal Dance" (Automatic African Remix) — 4:35
 "Tribal Dance" (Automatic Breakbeat Remix) — 4:49
 "Tribal Dance" (No No Rap Edit) — 3:45

 CD single, Belgium and Germany (1993)
 "Tribal Dance" (Rap Edit) — 3:41 
 "Tribal Dance" (Edit) — 3:41
 "Tribal Dance" (Extended) — 5:11
 "Tribal Dance" (Extended Rap) — 5:11
 "Tribal Dance" (Automatic African Remix) — 4:35
 "Tribal Dance" (Automatic Breakbeat Remix) — 4:48

 CD single, France (1993) 
 "Tribal Dance" (Radio Edit) — 3:40
 "Tribal Dance" (Radio Rap Edit) — 3:40

 CD single, UK (1993) 
 "Tribal Dance" (Edit) — 3:43
 "Tribal Dance" (Automatic African Remix) — 4:38
 "Tribal Dance" (Extended 12" Mix) — 5:13
 "Tribal Dance" (Automatic Breakbeat Mix) — 4:50
 "Tribal Dance" (Extended Rap) — 5:11

 CD maxi, France (1993) 
 "Tribal Dance" (Radio Edit) — 3:40
 "Tribal Dance" (Radio Rap Edit) — 3:40
 "Tribal Dance" (Extended) — 5:10
 "Tribal Dance" (Extended Rap) — 5:10

 12-inch maxi (2004)
 "Tribal Dance" 2.4 (Long Version) — 5:48
 "Tribal Dance" 2.4 (Revil O. Remix) — 7:33
 "Tribal Dance" 2.4 (2 Chains Club Mix) — 5:09
 "Tribal Dance" 2.4 (Original Extended Mix) — 5:11

 CD single (2004)
 "Tribal Dance" 2.4 (Xtreme Sound Radio Edit) — 3:23
 "Tribal Dance" 2.4 (Revil O. Short Mix) — 3:40
 "Tribal Dance" 2.4 (2 Chains Radio Cut) — 3:46
 "Tribal Dance" 2.4 (Original Radio Mix) — 3:42
 "Tribal Dance" 2.4 (Long Version) — 5:51
 "Tribal Dance" 2.4 (Revil O. Remix) — 7:35
 "Tribal Dance" 2.4 (2 Chains Club Mix) — 5:09
 "Tribal Dance" 2.4 (Original Extended Mix) — 5:07

Charts

Weekly charts

Year-end charts

Certifications

References

1993 songs
1993 singles
2004 singles
2 Unlimited songs
English-language Dutch songs
European Hot 100 Singles number-one singles
Number-one singles in Finland
Number-one singles in Israel
Number-one singles in Portugal
Number-one singles in Spain
Byte Records singles
Pete Waterman Entertainment singles
Songs written by Phil Wilde
Songs written by Ray Slijngaard
Music videos directed by Nick Burgess-Jones